The second season of the American television comedy series Louie premiered on June 23, 2011, and concluded on September 8, 2011. It consisted of thirteen episodes, each running approximately 23 minutes in length. FX broadcast the second season on Thursdays at 10:30 pm in the United States. The season was produced by 3 Arts Entertainment and the executive producers were Louis C.K., Dave Becky and M. Blair Breard. The second season was released on DVD and Blu-ray in region 1 on June 19, 2012.

Louie was created, written and directed by Louis C.K., who stars as a fictionalized version of himself, a comedian and newly divorced father raising his two daughters in New York City. The show has a loose format atypical for television comedy series, consisting of largely unconnected storylines and segments (described as "extended vignettes") that revolve around Louie's life, punctuated by live stand-up performances.

The season received critical acclaim from critics.

Cast

Main cast
 Louis C.K. as Louie

Recurring cast

Guest stars
 Nick DiPaolo as Nick ("Niece")
 Jim Norton as Jim ("Oh, Louie/Tickets")
 Chris Rock as Chris ("New Jersey/Airport")
 Godfrey as Godfrey ("Niece")
 F. Murray Abraham as Jonathan ("New Jersey/Airport")
 Amir Blumenfeld as Young Nervous Writer ("Halloween/Ellie")
 Dane Cook as Dane ("Oh, Louie/Tickets")
 Joan Rivers as Joan ("Joan")
 Bob Saget as Bob ("Oh, Louie/Tickets")
 Doug Stanhope as Eddie ("Eddie")
 Keni Thomas as Keni ("Duckling")
 Steven Wright as Steven ("New Jersey/Airport")

Episodes

Reception

Reviews
The second season of Louie received "universal acclaim" from critics, receiving a Metacritic score of 90 out of 100, based on seven reviews. Alan Sepinwall of HitFix called it "one of the best shows on television" and Kris King of Slant Magazine stated "Louie is smart, cinematic, and bitterly honest, constantly dancing between revelatory moments and hysterical bursts of humor that are both surprising and touching."

Awards and nominations
For the 64th Primetime Emmy Awards, Louis C.K. received three nominations for his work on Louie—he was nominated for Outstanding Lead Actor in a Comedy Series and Outstanding Directing for a Comedy Series (for "Duckling") and won for Outstanding Writing for a Comedy Series (for "Pregnant"). For the 28th TCA Awards, the series and C.K. himself each won for Outstanding Achievement in Comedy and Outstanding Individual Achievement in Comedy, respectively. C.K. and Pamela Adlon received a nomination for Best Television Comedy Series for the 64th Writers Guild of America Awards. C.K. was nominated for Best Actor – Television Series: Musical or Comedy for the 17th Satellite Awards. The series was also included as one of the Top Television Programs of the Year by the American Film Institute.

References

External links
 

2011 American television seasons